Adrián Annus (born 28 June 1973 in Szeged) is a Hungarian hammer thrower, who was stripped of his gold medal at the 2004 Summer Olympic Games in Athens for a doping violation in a highly publicized scandal. The disqualification received heightened attention, as it came on the heels of several drug scandals at the Athens Games and came as Annus' teammate, discus thrower Róbert Fazekas was also stripped of his Olympic title for a doping violation. The incident also received attention, as Annus refused for several months to return his gold medal, relenting only after the International Olympic Committee put pressure on the Hungarian Olympic Committee and threatened sanctions.

Career
Annus grew up in Gyula and moved to Szombathely in 1989. His first coach was Géza Annus, but joined Haladás VSE, the Szombathely sports club after his move. At Haladás Gyula Simon coached him, before Pál Németh took over. His first significant result came in 1992, when he finished eleventh in the discus throw at the World Junior Championship in Seoul.

In 1998, Adrián Annus finished eighth in the hammer at the European Championships in Budapest. This strong showing made Annus a potential contender for a medal at the 2000 Summer Olympic Games, but he was initially left out of the team due to stiff competition for a spot on the team. He eventually received a spot on the team due to an injury, but was not in top form to be a real contender and finished seventeenth.

Following the 2000 Olympics, Annus broke with his coach, Pál Németh, and joined József Vida.

2002 and 2003 were among his best years. In 2002 he won the European Championship and in 2003 he took silver at the World Championship. He also won the 2003 World Athletic Final. This achievement earned him the title 2003 Hungarian Sportsman of the Year.

Drug Scandal
In 2004, Annus was favored to win in Athens, but was stripped of his medal just a few days after winning, losing the gold medal to Koji Murofushi. The International Olympic Committee concluded, that his urine samples—taken before and after competition—showed evidence of belonging to different people, therefore indicating tampering. The IOC also attempted to test Annus shortly after his competition in Athens, but Annus refused the test, which by itself warranted his disqualification.

The IOC never officially concluded how it was possible for Annus to provide samples that belonged to different people, but track and field insiders said he likely used a device, which included a container for urine and a fake penis and emptied the container into the testing bottle when required to provide a sample.

Following a rejected appeal and a hearing by the Court of Arbitration for Sport, Annus was banned for two years. Following the ban, Annus began training and started competing in 2007.

See also
List of sportspeople sanctioned for doping offences

Results
1996: Atlanta, Olympic Games, 28th
1998: Budapest, European Championships 8th
2000: Sydney, Olympic Games 17th
2001: Edmonton, World Championships 9th
2001: Beijing, Summer Universiade, 3rd
2002: Münich, European Champions, 1st
2002: Madrid, World Cup, 1st
2002: Paris, Grand Prix, 2nd
2003: Szombathely, Hungary, MAL Cup, 84 meter 19 cm - Hungarian record
2003: Paris, World Championships, 2nd
2003: Szombathely (Hungary), World Athletics Final, 1st

Awards
 Hungarian athlete of the Year (1): 2003

Notes

External links
 Annus's official home page

1973 births
Living people
Sportspeople from Szeged
Hungarian male hammer throwers
Doping cases in athletics
Hungarian sportspeople in doping cases
Athletes (track and field) at the 1996 Summer Olympics
Athletes (track and field) at the 2000 Summer Olympics
Athletes (track and field) at the 2004 Summer Olympics
Olympic athletes of Hungary
Competitors stripped of Summer Olympics medals
World Athletics Championships medalists
European Athletics Championships medalists
Universiade medalists in athletics (track and field)
Universiade bronze medalists for Hungary
Medalists at the 2001 Summer Universiade